Temnosternus planiusculus is a species of beetle in the family Cerambycidae. It was described by White in 1855. It is known from Australia.

References

Tmesisternini
Beetles described in 1855